Nahanni Johnstone is a Canadian actress.  She was nominated for the Gemini Award for Best Performance by an Actress in a Featured Supporting Role in a Dramatic Program or Mini-Series for her performance in Booky and the Secret Santa (2007).

Select filmography
The Cutting Edge (1992)
The Real Blonde (1998)
Love in the Time of Money (2002)
Real Gangsters (2013)
Revenge of the Green Dragons (2014)

References

External links
 

Living people
20th-century Canadian actresses
21st-century Canadian actresses
Canadian film actresses
Canadian television actresses
Year of birth missing (living people)